The 1991 Kent State Golden Flashes football team was an American football team that represented Kent State University in the Mid-American Conference (MAC) during the 1991 NCAA Division I-A football season. In their first season under head coach Pete Cordelli, the Golden Flashes compiled a 1–10 record (1–7 against MAC opponents), finished in a tie for ninth place in the MAC, and were outscored by all opponents by a combined total of 307 to 159.

The team's statistical leaders included Brad Smith with 645 rushing yards, Kevin Shuman with 943 passing yards, and Shawn Barnes with 558 receiving yards.

Schedule

References

Kent State
Kent State Golden Flashes football seasons
Kent State Golden Flashes football